Down the Stretch is a 1936 American drama film directed by William Clemens and written by William Jacobs. The film stars Patricia Ellis, Mickey Rooney, Dennis Moore, Willie Best, Gordon Hart and Wild Bill Elliott. The film was released by Warner Bros. on September 18, 1936.

Plot

Snapper Sinclair's father once rode for stable owners Patricia and Cliff Barrington, but later was found to have thrown races and was banned from the track. To keep Snapper from being sent to reform school, Patricia offers him a job.

A fast but untamed horse called Faithful quickly becomes Snapper's favorite. He wins races as its jockey, but when he refuses to throw one for gamblers, they reveal publicly who Snapper's father was and suspicion falls on Snapper, who is no longer allowed any mounts.

He leaves for England, where he becomes a very successful rider. One day the Barringtons are there to enter Faithful in a race. Snapper discovers that they are nearly broke. He deliberately loses the race so that Faithful can win. Not sure where to turn next, Snapper is pleased when the Barringtons invite him to come back home.

Cast        
 Patricia Ellis as Patricia Barrington
 Mickey Rooney as 'Snapper' Sinclair, aka Fred St. Clair
 Dennis Moore as Cliff Barrington
 Willie Best as Noah 
 Gordon Hart as Judge Adams
 Wild Bill Elliott as Robert Bates 
 Virginia Brissac as Aunt Julia
 Charles C. Wilson as Tex Reardon 
 Joseph Crehan as Secretary C.D. Burch
 Mary Treen as Nurse
 Robert Emmett Keane as Nick
 Charley Foy as Arnold Roach
 Crauford Kent as Sir Oliver Martin

References

External links 
 
 
 
 

1936 films
1936 drama films
American black-and-white films
American drama films
Films directed by William Clemens
American horse racing films
Warner Bros. films
1930s English-language films
1930s American films
English-language drama films